Noell may refer to:

Surname 
Charles Noell (born c. 1953), American businessman and racehorse owner
Charles P. Noell (1812–1887), American politician
John William Noell (1816–1863), American politician
Martin Noell, English merchant
Robert Noell, Chief Justice of Jamaica in 1688
Thomas Noell (died 1702),  26th Mayor of New York City
Thomas E. Noell (1839–1867), American politician

Given name 
Noell Coet (born 1994), American actress

See also 
Noel (disambiguation)
Noelle